Oak Grove Methodist Church is a historic church in Ten Mile, Tennessee.

It was built in 1890 in the Gothic Revival style. It was added to the National Register of Historic Places in 1982.

References

Methodist churches in Tennessee
Churches on the National Register of Historic Places in Tennessee
1890s architecture in the United States
Buildings and structures in Meigs County, Tennessee
National Register of Historic Places in Meigs County, Tennessee